was a noted Japanese author of fiction.

Shimamura was born in Nagano Prefecture, and in 1931 graduated from college with an English degree. His first book was published in 1941, and in 1943 his book 暁雲 became the first of his several candidates for the Akutagawa Prize. He founded a company in 1955 which went bankrupt in 1962, after which he took up writing full-time. Shimamura won the 1979 Yomiuri Prize for Myōkō no aki.

English translations 
 "Sumida River", in Seven stories of modern Japan, Leith Morton ed., Wild Peony, 1991. .

References

Sources
 Japanese Wikipedia article
 Jlit entry
 Akutagawa Award Candidates: Shimamura Toshimasa

Japanese writers
1912 births
1981 deaths
Yomiuri Prize winners